Cheyenne Business College was a trade school in Cheyenne, Wyoming that existed in the early 20th century.

History 

According to the Casper Morning Star, Cheyenne Business College was incorporated in the early 1890s. A biography of founder Daniel C. Royer says he first established the college in 1896, abandoned it to take classes at another institution, then re-established the college circa 1901.

A 1903 U.S. Office of Education report listed Cheyenne Business College as having two instructors and 72 students, with Royer as the college's executive officer.

On May 24, 1930, A. W. Johnston School of Business in Billings, Montana announced that they had purchased Cheyenne Business College to run as a second school, according to The Billings Gazette.

According to a 1994 almanac, the college closed in the 1930s in the wake of the Great Depression.

Basketball 
Cheyenne Business College had a men's basketball team at least as early as 1903. According to newspapers from the time, the Cheyenne team held the championship of Nebraska, Colorado, and Wyoming in 1903 and 1904.

In November 1904, Cheyenne's center died in a train accident.

On January 18, 1907, Cheyenne defeated the visiting Wyoming Cowboys by a score of 72–16, which remains the largest margin of defeat in University of Wyoming history  Wyoming's media guide lists 1 win and 6 losses to Cheyenne Business College between the 1906–07 season and the 1909–10 season.

Game log 

Source: Opponents' media guides

Location 
Cheyenne Business College was located in the Deming Building in downtown Cheyenne. The Deming Building was built in 1911 and is located at 1620 Central Ave. The building is still standing today and a faded sign for the college is still visible on one side of the building.

References

External links 
 Photographs of Cheyenne Business College at the Wyoming State Archives
 Cheyenne Business College at Sports Reference

College men's basketball teams in the United States
Buildings and structures in Cheyenne, Wyoming
Organizations based in Cheyenne, Wyoming
Universities and colleges in Wyoming
Business schools in the United States